Yacine Babouche (born 21 March 1978) is an Algerian professional footballer who plays for CA Batna in the Algerian Ligue Professionnelle 1, as a goalkeeper. He was a runner-up in the 2009–10 Algerian Cup.

References

1978 births
Living people
People from Batna, Algeria
Algerian footballers
Association football goalkeepers
CA Batna players
21st-century Algerian people